Oued Zitoun  is a town and commune in El Taref Province, Algeria. According to the 1998 census it has a population of 5,321.

See also

Oued Zitoun (Tunisia)

References

Communes of El Taref Province